"Daydream" is a song recorded in 1969 by the Belgian band Wallace Collection. It was composed by band members Sylvain Vanholme and Raymond Vincent, with David MacKay who also produced the single. The song is in the symphonic pop/rock genre, and uses strings and flutes. The song was a hit in mainland Europe, though popularity didn't make it to English speaking countries, despite its use of English lyrics. The song was covered several times, most notably by the Gunter Kallmann Choir in 1970.

Cover versions
The French pop star Claude François, known for writing the original "My Way", released his cover "Rêveries" in April 1969.

The song was covered in 1970 by the German vocal group the Günter Kallmann Choir, and this version was used on a popular easy listening record of the time. As such Kallmann is occasionally mis-credited as the original author of the song. In 2001, English electronic group I Monster had a UK chart hit with "Daydream in Blue", a remix of the Günter Kallmann Choir's version of the song: the track peaked at #20 in the UK Singles Chart.  The song has also been covered live by the Beta Band as part of their song "Squares". I Monster's version was sampled in 2006 by American rapper Lupe Fiasco in Daydreamin’, featuring soul singer Jill Scott. Fiasco’s cover won the Grammy Award for Best Urban/Alternative Performance.

Charts

Weekly charts

Year-end charts

Samples
"Daydream" has been sampled on the following songs:
 "Gangsta Rap" by Hamburg rap group Fettes Brot, on their 1995 album Auf Einem Auge Blöd.
 A remix of "She Said" by The Pharcyde released on Go! Discs Records in 1996. The remix was produced by Fuzz Face (i.e. Geoff Barrow) and tWANK Boy.
 Cut Killer's mixtape, Cut Killer Show Présente: Operation Freestyle of 1998.
 "On a Beautiful Day", by British electronica/alternative rock band Skinny, from their 2001 album Taller (samples the Gunter Kallman Choir version).
 The Beta Band sampled the song for their 2001 song "Squares" (samples the Gunter Kallman Choir version).
 "Daydream in Blue" by I Monster in their 2003 album Neveroddoreven (samples the Gunter Kallman Choir version). This version was used as the basis for  "Daydreamin'" by Lupe Fiasco featuring Jill Scott, on his 2006 debut album Lupe Fiasco's Food and Liquor.
 "Hood Dreamin" by Guru (with a sped-up version of the song), from his 2005 solo album Version 7.0: The Street Scriptures.
 "The Highest Commitment" by Qwel and Maker, in some live versions (samples the Gunter Kallmann Choir version)
 "Put Me On (featuring Everlast and Moka Only)" by Swollen Members features a piano background with chords similar in sound to the vocals of the original "Daydream" track.
 "Magenta Rising" by Parov Stelar on his 2015 album The Demon Diaries.
 "Daydream" by Paul Basic on his 2011 album The Mirror.
 The bassline and a similar arrangement were used by Isaac Hayes on "Ike's Rap II", which has in turn been sampled by Portishead, Tricky and Alessia Cara.

Soundtrack appearances
In Norway, this song has become widely known through its use as background music in a series of televised information snippets regarding mountain safety, produced by the Norwegian Red Cross and broadcast annually through the Norwegian Broadcasting Corporation, chiefly around the Easter holidays. The original series was broadcast from 1969, but the theme tune was not introduced until 1972. 

The Belgian film Mr. Nobody in 2009 also used this song several times in the movie.

In 2016, "Daydream in Blue", a remix of the song by I Monster, was featured in the second season of the US television show Mr. Robot starring Rami Malek and Christian Slater.

The song was also used in Noah Hawley's Legion season three, episode four, released in 2019.

The first season of the US television show Severance (2022) has also made use of the I Monster version in trailers and during closing credits on some episodes.

The 2005 BBC television series "How to be a gardener" written and presented by Alan Titchmarsh used the "Daydream in Blue" version of the song as part of its extensive soundtrack.

References

1969 songs
1969 singles